The following lists are the winners of the Pocket Athletic Conference All-Sports Trophy. The trophy is determined by calculating fixed points for standings within the conference, then dropping the lowest score for schools that field teams for all conference-sponsored competitions (a team that does not field a sport would have that sport count as their dropped score. The trophy has been awarded since the 1969-70 school year in Boys' sports, and since 1977-78 for Girls' sports.

Boys

Year     Champion  
 1970 South Spencer
 1971 Huntingburg
 1972 Wood Memorial
 1973 Fort Branch
 1974 South Spencer
 1975 Southridge
 1976 Southridge
 1977 Southridge
 1978 Southridge
 1979 Southridge
 1980 Heritage Hills
 1981 Heritage Hills
 1982 Southridge
 1983 Heritage Hills
 1984 Heritage Hills

Year     Champion  
 1985 Southridge
 1986 Southridge
 1987 Heritage Hills
 1988 Heritage Hills
 1989 Heritage Hills
 1990 Southridge
 1991 Pike Central
 1992 Heritage Hills
 1993 Heritage Hills
 1994 Heritage Hills
 1995 Pike Central
 1996 Heritage Hills
 1997 Heritage Hills
 1998 Heritage Hills
 1999 Heritage Hills

Year     Champion  
 2000 Heritage Hills
 2001 Gibson Southern
 2002 Heritage Hills
 2003 Heritage Hills
 2004 Heritage Hills
 2005 Heritage Hills
 2006 Southridge
 2007 Heritage Hills
 2008 Heritage Hills
 2009 Heritage Hills
 2010 Heritage Hills
 2011 Forest Park
 2012 Gibson Southern/Heritage Hills
 2013 Gibson Southern
 2014 Gibson Southern

Year     Champion  
 2015 Gibson Southern
 2016 Gibson Southern
 2017 Heritage Hills
 2018 Heritage Hills
 2019 Heritage Hills

Girls

Year     Champion  
 1978 Southridge
 1979 Gibson Southern
 1980 Gibson Southern
 1981 Southridge
 1982 Southridge
 1983 Southridge
 1984 Southridge
 1985 Heritage Hills
 1986 Heritage Hills
 1987 Heritage Hills
 1988 Southridge
 1989 Southridge
 1990 Pike Central

Year     Champion  
 1991 Pike Central
 1992 Pike Central
 1993 Pike Central
 1994 Heritage Hills
 1995 Pike Central
 1996 Heritage Hills
 1997 Gibson Southern/Southridge
 1998 Southridge
 1999 Southridge
 2000 Southridge
 2001 Southridge
 2002 Southridge
 2003 Southridge

Year     Champion  
 2004 Southridge
 2005 Southridge
 2006 Southridge
 2007 Southridge
 2008 Gibson Southern
 2009 Gibson Southern
 2010 Gibson Southern
 2011 Southridge
 2012 Gibson Southern
 2013 Gibson Southern
 2014 Gibson Southern
 2015 Gibson Southern
 2016 Gibson Southern

Year     Champion  
 2017 Gibson Southern
 2018 Gibson Southern
 2019 Gibson Southern

Sources 
PAC History of Champions

Pocket Athletic Conference